Pongchau-Wakka is one of the 60 assembly constituencies of  Arunachal Pradesh a north east state of India. It is part of Arunachal East Lok Sabha constituency.

Members of Legislative Assembly
 1978: Wnagnam Wangshu, Janata Party
 1980: Haijen Ponglaham, Indian National Congress (I)
 1984: Haijen Ponglaham, Indian National Congress (I)
 1990: Anok Wangsa, Indian National Congress
 1995: Honchun Ngandam, Independent
 1999: Anok Wangsa, Nationalist Congress Party
 2004: Honchun Ngandam, Indian National Congress
 2009: Honchun Ngandam, Indian National Congress
 2014: Honchun Ngandam, Indian National Congress

Election results

2019

See also

 Pongchau-Wakka
 Longding district
 List of constituencies of Arunachal Pradesh Legislative Assembly

References

Assembly constituencies of Arunachal Pradesh
Longding district